The following is a list of parliamentary constituencies in Zimbabwe, as broken down by province.

The National Assembly, the lower house of the Parliament of Zimbabwe, consists of 270 members. Of these, 210 are elected in single-member constituencies of roughly equal size, with provinces having a varying number of constituencies depending on population. (The remaining 60 seats are elected using proportional representation at the province level, and are reserved for women).

Bulawayo

 Bulawayo Central
 Bulawayo East
 Bulawayo South
 Emakhandeni–Entumbane
 Lobengula
 Luveve
 Magwegwe
 Makokoba
 Nketa
 Nkulumane
 Pelandaba–Mpopoma
 Pumula

Harare

 Budiriro
 Chitungwiza North
 Chitungwiza South
 Epworth
 Dzivarasekwa
 Glen Norah
 Glen View North
 Glen View South
 Harare Central
 Harare East
 Harare North
 Harare South
 Harare West
 Hatfield
 Highfield East
 Highfield West
 Kambuzuma
 Kuwadzana
 Kuwadzana East
 Mabvuku–Tafara
 Mbare
 Mount Pleasant
 Mufakose
 Southerton
 St Mary's
 Sunningdale
 Warren Park
 Zengeza East
 Zengeza West

Manicaland

 Buhera Central
 Buhera North
 Buhera South
 Buhera West
 Chimanimani East
 Chimanimani West
 Chipinge Central
 Chipinge East
 Chipinge South
 Chipinge West
 Dangamvura–Chikanga
 Headlands
 Makoni Central
 Makoni North
 Makoni South
 Makoni West
 Musikavanhu
 Mutare Central
 Mutare North
 Mutare South
 Mutare West
 Mutasa Central
 Mutasa North
 Mutasa South
 Nyanga North
 Nyanga South

Mashonaland Central

 Bindura North
 Bindura South
 Guruve North
 Guruve South
 Mazowe Central
 Mazowe North
 Mazowe South
 Mazowe West
 Mbire
 Mount Darwin East
 Mount Darwin North
 Mount Darwin South
 Mount Darwin West
 Muzarabani North
 Muzarabani South
 Rushinga
 Shamva North
 Shamva South

Mashonaland East

 Chikomba Central
 Chikomba East
 Chikomba West
 Goromonzi North
 Goromonzi South
 Goromonzi West
 Maramba–Pfungwe
 Marondera Central
 Marondera East
 Marondera West
 Mudzi North
 Mudzi South
 Mudzi West
 Murehwa North
 Murehwa South
 Murehwa West
 Mutoko East
 Mutoko North
 Mutoko South
 Seke
 Wedza North
 Wedza South
 Uzumba

Mashonaland West

 Chakari
 Chegutu East
 Chegutu West
 Chinhoyi
 Hurungwe Central
 Hurungwe East
 Hurungwe North
 Hurungwe West
 Kadoma Central
 Kariba
 Magunje
 Makonde
 Mhangura
 Mhondoro–Mubaira
 Mhondoro–Ngezi
 Muzvezve
 Norton
 Sanyati
 Zvimba East
 Zvimba North
 Zvimba South
 Zvimba West

Masvingo

 Bikita East
 Bikita South
 Bikita West
 Chiredzi East
 Chiredzi North
 Chiredzi South
 Chiredzi West
 Chivi Central
 Chivi North
 Chivi South
 Gutu Central
 Gutu East
 Gutu North
 Gutu South
 Gutu West
 Masvingo Central
 Masvingo North
 Masvingo South
 Masvingo Urban
 Masvingo West
 Mwenezi East
 Mwenezi West
 Zaka Central
 Zaka East
 Zaka North
 Zaka West

Matabeleland North

 Binga North
 Binga South
 Bubi
 Lupane East
 Lupane West
 Nkayi South
 Nkayi North
 Tsholotsho North
 Tsholotsho South
 Hwange East
 Hwange Central
 Hwange West
 Umguza

Matabeleland South

 Beitbridge East
 Beitbridge West
 Bulilima East
 Bulilima West
 Gwanda North
 Gwanda Central
 Gwanda South
 Insiza North
 Insiza South
 Mangwe
 Matobo North
 Matobo South
 Umzingwane

Midlands

 Chirumhanzu
 Chirumanzu–Zibagwe
 Chiwundura
 Gokwe Central
 Gokwe–Chireya
 Gokwe–Gumunyu
 Gokwe–Kabuyuni
 Gokwe–Kana
 Gokwe–Mapfungautsi
 Gokwe–Nembudziya
 Gokwe–Sengwa
 Gokwe–Sasame
 Gweru Urban
 Kwekwe Central
 Mberengwa East
 Mberengwa North
 Mbrerengwa South
 Mberengwa West
 Mbizo
 Mkoba
 Redcliff
 Shurugwi North
 Shurugwi South
 Silobela
 Vungu
 Zhombe
 Zvishavane–Ngezi
 Zvishavane–Runde

See also 

 Elections in Zimbabwe

References 

Zimbabwe
Constituencies